Brandywine Avenue School was a historic school located at Schenectady in Schenectady County, New York. It was built in 1904 and was a -story, red brick "U" shaped institutional building in the Classical Revival style.  It sat on a basement of rock-faced limestone and had a hipped roof.  It operated as a teacher training facility from 1910 to 1925 and ceased being used as a school in 1974.  From 1975 to 1996, it housed Schenectady City School District administrative offices and records storage.

It was added to the National Register of Historic Places in 1999.

It was destroyed by a fire in November 2007.

References

School buildings on the National Register of Historic Places in New York (state)
Neoclassical architecture in New York (state)
School buildings completed in 1904
Schools in Schenectady County, New York
Burned school buildings in the United States
National Register of Historic Places in Schenectady County, New York
1904 establishments in New York (state)